Nikolett Pádár (born 30 March 2006) is a Hungarian competitive swimmer. She is a Hungarian record holder in the short course 4×100-metre freestyle relay. At the 2021 European Short Course Championships, she placed fifth in the 200-metre freestyle. At the 2022 European Aquatics Championships (long course), she placed eighth in the final of the 200-metre freestyle and won a bronze medal in the 4×200-metre freestyle relay. She is five-time World Junior Championships gold medalist, winning gold medals in the 100-metre freestyle, 200-metre freestyle, 4×100-metre freestyle relay, 4×200-metre freestyle relay, and 4×100-metre mixed freestyle relay at the 2022 World Junior Championships. She is a ten-time medalist at the European Junior Championships, including winning the European junior title in the 200-metre freestyle in 2021 and 2022 and the 100-metre freestyle in 2022.

Background
Pádár was born 30 March 2006 in Szeged, Hungary and competes for Szegedi Úszó Egylet in regional and national competitions. She trains locally at a pool in Szeged, with multiple sessions in the pool a day.

Career

2021
At the 2021 European Junior Swimming Championships, held starting 6 July in Rome, Italy at Stadio Olimpico del Nuoto, Pádár won the gold medal in the 200-metre freestyle with a time of 1:59.38. She also won a gold medal in the 4×200-metre freestyle relay, a bronze medal in the 4×100-metre freestyle relay, a bronze medal in the 4×100-metre mixed freestyle relay, placed fourth in the 4×100-metre medley relay for her contributions swimming freestyle on the preliminaries relay, and placed tenth in the 100-metre freestyle. In November of the same year, she placed fifth in the final of the 200-metre freestyle at the 2021 European Short Course Swimming Championships, held at the Palace of Water Sports in Kazan, Russia, with a time of 1:56.14 in the final after progressing through preliminaries with a time of 1:57.02 and semifinals with a time of 1:56.31. She also placed 15th in the 100-metre freestyle, 34th in the 100-metre individual medley, and 42nd in the 50-metre freestyle.

The following month, at the 2021 World Short Course Championships, in Abu Dhabi, United Arab Emirates with swimming contested at Etihad Arena, Pádár helped achieve a Hungarian record in the 4×100-metre freestyle relay with a time of 3:36.20 in the preliminaries, qualifying for the final ranking seventh before placing seventh in the final with a time of 3:36.94. She also placed fifth in the 4×200-metre freestyle relay, swimming the third leg of the relay in both the preliminaries and the final, and placed 23rd in the 200-metre freestyle with a time of 1:59.43.

2022

2022 World Aquatics Championships
On the first day of pool swimming competition at the 2022 World Aquatics Championships, held in Budapest, Pádár helped achieve an eighth-place finish in the 4×100-metre freestyle relay, swimming the first 100 metres portion of the relay in 55.16 seconds to contribute to the final time of 3:38.20. Two days later, she placed 18th in the 200-metre freestyle with a time of 1:58.90. In her third and final event, the 4×200-metre freestyle relay on the fifth day, she contributed a lead-off time of 1:58.01 to the time of 7:57.90 in the final to help place fifth in the event.

2022 European Junior Championships

On 5 July, at the 2022 European Junior Swimming Championships hosted by Otopeni, Romania in July, Pádár started off with an eighth-place finish in the 4×100-metre freestyle relay, swimming a 55.37 for the lead-off leg of the relay. The following day, day two of competition, she won the gold medal in the 200-metre freestyle for her second consecutive title in the event, finishing in a time of 1:58.43. Later in the finals session, she won a gold medal as part of the 4×100-metre mixed freestyle relay, splitting a time of 54.28 seconds for the third leg of the relay. The third day, she swam the fourth leg of the 4×200-metre freestyle relay in a time of 1:57.29 to help achieve a finish in 7:59.04 and win the gold medal in the event.

Day four, in her fifth event of the Championships, Pádár swam the freestyle leg of the 4×100-metre medley relay in 54.95 seconds to help place fourth in a time of 3:54.47. The fifth day, 9 July, she won the gold medal in the 100-metre freestyle with a personal best time of 54.69 seconds, finishing 0.51 seconds ahead of silver medalist Dóra Molnár, also of Hungary, 0.65 seconds ahead of bronze medalist Roos Vanotterdijk of Belgium, and a little over one second slower than the Hungarian record of 53.64 seconds set by Katinka Hosszú. The sixth and final day, she won the bronze medal in the 400-metre freestyle with a personal best time of 4:12.04 for her first event of the finals session. In her eighth and final event of the Championships, she won a silver medal in the 4×100-metre medley relay, anchoring the relay with a time of 54.04 seconds to finish in 4:05.48.

2022 European Aquatics Championships

Pádár was announced to the official 2022 European Aquatics Championships roster for Team Hungary in late July. Day one of swimming, contested at Foro Italico in Rome, Italy, she swam a time of 55.66 seconds in the preliminaries of the 100-metre freestyle, qualifying for the semifinals ranking thirteenth overall. She withdrew from further competition in the event prior to the semifinal heats. In the evening session, she led-off the 4×200-metre freestyle relay in the final with a 1:58.52, helping win the bronze medal in a time of 7:55.73. Two days later, she ranked fifth in the prelims heats of the 200-metre freestyle, qualifying for the semifinals with a time of 1:59.62. In the semifinals, she swam a personal best time of 1:57.80 and qualified for the final ranking fifth. For her final event of the day, she led-off the 4×100-metre freestyle relay in the final with a 55.19, helping place fifth in 3:39.42. In the final of the 200 metre freestyle the following day, she placed eighth with a time of 1:58.87.

The fifth day, Pádár contributed a split time of 54.98 seconds for the third leg of the 4×100-metre mixed freestyle relay in the final to help achieve a time of 3:26.54 along with Nándor Németh, Szebasztián Szabó, and Dóra Molnár and place seventh. She competed in the final of the 4×200-metre mixed freestyle relay on day six, splitting a 1:58.70 for the third leg to help place fourth in 7:34.55, which was 2.70 seconds behind the team from Italy that won the bronze medal.

2022 World Junior Championships

In advance of the 2022 FINA World Junior Swimming Championships, starting 30 August in Lima, Peru, Pádár was one of fifteen swimmers in the Hungarian contingent who entered to compete at the Championships. For her first event, the 4×200-metre freestyle relay on day one, she helped qualify the relay to the final ranking third with a time of 8:26.65 in the preliminaries. On the lead-off leg of the relay in the final, she swam a 1:58.37, contributing to a time of 8:04.70, and winning a gold medal. The next morning, she ranked third in the preliminary heats of the 100-metre freestyle, qualifying for the semifinals with a time of 56.28 seconds. In the evening, she qualified for the final of the 100-metre freestyle ranking first with a time of 55.62 seconds in the semifinals and was disqualified along with her relay teammates in the final of the 4×100-metre mixed medley relay when the third swimmer left early on their start.

For her first final on day three, Pádár won the world junior title and gold medal in the 100-metre freestyle with a time of 55.11 seconds. In her second final of the evening, she split a 54.41 for the third leg of the 4×100-metre mixed freestyle relay, contributing to a gold medal-winning time of 3:30.03. Splitting a 57.00 for the second leg of the 4×100-metre freestyle relay in the preliminaries two days later, she helped qualify for the final ranking second with a time of 3:51.04. She helped win the gold medal in the final, contributing to the final mark of 3:41.94 with a time of 54.90 seconds for the second leg of the relay. On the sixth and final day, she tied Giulia Vetrano of Italy for first-rank in the morning preliminaries of the 200-metre freestyle with a 2:02.00, qualifying for the final. In the evening final, she won the gold medal, this time sharing the podium with Giulia Vetrano, who finished 1.35 seconds behind her time of 1:58.19 to win the bronze medal. A little over 30 minutes later, she anchored the 4×100-metre medley relay with a time of 55.13, which was the fastest freestyle time of all relay teams in the final, helping place fourth in 4:09.33.

2022 Hungarian Short Course Championships
In the morning preliminary heats on the first day of the 2022 Hungarian National Short Course Championships in November in Kaposvár, Pádár dropped over seven full seconds from her personal best time in the 400-metre freestyle with a time of 4:04.12. For the evening finals session, she won two silver medals, the first in the 100-metre freestyle with a time of 54.09 seconds and the second in the 400-metre freestyle with a time of 4:05.39. The following day, she finished in a personal best time of 25.39 seconds in the 50-metre freestyle to place fourth in the final. On the third day, she won the gold medal and national title in the 200-metre freestyle with a personal best time of 1:54.58, which was the only time by a female swimmer in the race faster than 1:55.00.

International championships (50 m)

 Pádár swam only in the prelims heats.

International championships (25 m)

Personal best times

Long course metres (50 m pool)

Legend: sf – semifinal

Short course metres (25 m pool)

Legend: sf – semifinal; h – preliminaries heat

National records

Short course metres (25 m pool)

Legend: h – preliminaries heat

Awards and honours
 M4 Sport, Hungarian Youth Athlete of the Year (female): 2022
 M4 Sport, Hungarian Youth Athletes Performance of the Year (individual sports, women's team): 2022 (4×100-metre freestyle relay and 4×200-metre freestyle relay at the 2022 World Junior Championships)
 M4 Sport, Hungarian Youth Athletes Performance of the Year (individual sports, mixed team): 2022 (4×100-metre mixed freestyle relay at the 2022 World Junior Championships)

References

External links
 

2006 births
Living people
Sportspeople from Szeged
Hungarian female freestyle swimmers
European Aquatics Championships medalists in swimming
21st-century Hungarian women